The Grinch Grinches the Cat in the Hat (also known as The Cat in the Hat Gets Grinched) is a 1982 American Emmy Award-winning animated musical television special and crossover starring The Cat in the Hat and The Grinch. It was completed in 1981, It premiered on May 20, 1982, on ABC and would be DePatie and Freleng's final Dr. Seuss special and the only Dr. Seuss cartoon by Marvel Productions. The songs were written by Sesame Street composer Joe Raposo.

Plot 
The Grinch wakes up in a good mood one morning until his reflection in the mirror (possibly an envisioning of his father) speaks to him, prompting him to repeat the "Grinch's Oath", reminding him of his evil nature, and he leaves to prove himself. Meanwhile, The Cat in the Hat goes on a picnic. Their paths cross when the Grinch bumps his car into the Cat's, and things quickly escalate into a fierce car chase after the Cat unintentionally insults the Grinch by calling him "Mr. Greenface".

The Cat returns to the safety of his home, but the Grinch follows him to demonstrate a device he has invented, an "Acoustical Anti-Audial Bleeper", also referred to as a "Vacusound Sweeper", that scrambles all sounds within a 50-mile radius, including the Cat's voice. Back home, the Grinch decides to upgrade the sweeper into a "darkhouse", an anti-lighthouse that spreads beams of darkness.

The Cat becomes upset with the Grinch's hijinks and has a psychiatric session with him in a thought bubble to find out what makes him so mean-spirited. He gets nowhere with the imaginary Grinch (though he is briefly triggered by the memory of his deceased mother), so the Cat then decides to go over and have a talk with him. The Grinch makes it so dark that the Cat can't see where he's going, and he crashes his car when he passes a "Dead End" sign. The Grinch decides to liven things up by changing the beam of darkness to persimmon pink.

The Cat takes refuge in a nearby restaurant, while the Grinch sends beams that make things change colors, and literally and crazily come to life, and his hijinks result in confusion all over the restaurant. The Cat is now furious with the Grinch and ponders to himself how he can change the Grinch, eventually finding an idea and rallies up everybody in the restaurant to follow him to the Grinch's house. There, he leads everyone in a song to remind the Grinch of all of the love he received from his mother and implore him to change his ways and be a better person. Before the Grinch can get to the darkhouse to scramble it, he collapses in grief over the memory of his mother (whose reflection in the puddle of his tears comforts him) and he and Max dismantle the darkhouse.

The next morning, the Grinch is again happy. When the reflection tries to turn him evil again, Max reveals he left the Vacusound Sweeper intact and scrambles the reflection's words.

Voice cast 
 Mason Adams as The Cat in the Hat / Narrator
 Bob Holt as The Grinch / Waiter / The Grinch's Mother
 Frank Welker as Max / Waiter / Additional voices
 Joe Eich as Chef

Musical numbers 
 "A Beelzeberry Day" – The Cat
 "Relax-ification" – The Cat
 "Master of Everyone's Ears" – The Grinch
 "Most Horrible Things" – The Grinch
 "Psychiatry Song" – The Cat
 "Remember Your Mother" – The Cat / Chef / String Quintet / Waiters/ Male Quartet Singers

Awards 
1982 Primetime Emmy Award for Outstanding Animated Program.

Production notes 
Both the Grinch and the Cat in the Hat were recast with different voice actors than the ones used in previous specials, all of whom had died. Bob Holt voiced the Grinch (Hans Conried, who voiced the Grinch in Halloween Is Grinch Night, died a few months before this special had aired, while Boris Karloff, the original voice of the Grinch, died in 1969), while Mason Adams took over voicing the Cat in the Hat from Allan Sherman, who died in 1973.

Since Freleng was absent from production on Pink at First Sight due to him breaking up the studio he began with DePatie before returning to Warner Bros., this was the only other fully animated DFE production to be made by Marvel Productions and one of the last DFE cartoons Freleng was involved in.

Home media 
The special was first released on VHS in the mid-80s via CBS/Fox Video's Playhouse Video division, and reissued later in the decade. This release used its working title The Cat in the Hat Gets Grinched. The special retained its normal name on VHS re-releases (including Dr. Seuss Sing-Along Classics by 20th Century Fox Home Entertainment with CBS Video and Fox Kids Video). It was also re-released on VHS in 2000 by Paramount Home Entertainment.

It was later released on DVD by Universal Pictures Home Entertainment/Universal Studios Family Productions. The special was released again on DVD by Warner Home Video on October 18, 2011 as part of the Dr. Seuss's Holidays on the Loose! DVD set, along with How the Grinch Stole Christmas! and Halloween Is Grinch Night. In October 2018, it was released on Blu-ray by Warner Bros. Home Entertainment as an extra on Dr. Seuss' How the Grinch Stole Christmas: The Ultimate Edition, along with Halloween Is Grinch Night. Both extras were remastered in high definition for this release.

References

External links 
 

1982 films
1982 animated films
1982 television films
1982 television specials
1980s American animated films
1980s American television specials
1980s animated television specials
Dr. Seuss television specials
American Broadcasting Company television specials
ABC Weekend Special
Animated crossover television specials
Animated crossover films
Fiction about shapeshifting
Musical television specials
Emmy Award-winning programs
Films scored by Joe Raposo
Television shows written by Dr. Seuss
Television specials by Marvel Productions
Television specials by DePatie–Freleng Enterprises
The Grinch (franchise)
The Cat in the Hat